is a Japanese Professional baseball pitcher for the Fukuoka SoftBank Hawks of Nippon Professional Baseball.

Early baseball career
Taura pitched in the 2rd grade spring 88th Japanese High School Baseball Invitational Tournament and the 2rd grade summer 98th Japanese High School Baseball Championship. And he pitched in the 3rd grade spring 89th Japanese High School Baseball Invitational Tournament and the 3rd grade summer 99th Japanese High School Baseball Championship as an ace pitcher at the Syugakukan High School.

In 2017, he was selected as the Japan national baseball team in the 2017 U-18 Baseball World Cup and recorded 29 Strikeouts in 13 2/3 innings, and was chosen as the Best Nine.

Professional career
On October 26, 2017, Taura was drafted by the Fukuoka Softbank Hawks in the 2017 Nippon Professional Baseball draft.

In 2018 season, Taura played in the Western League of NPB's minor leagues and played in informal matches against the Shikoku Island League Plus's teams.

On July 10, 2019, Taura debuted in the Pacific League against the Saitama Seibu Lions as a relief pitcher. In 2019 season, he pitched 8 games in the Pacific League.

In 2020 season, Taura spent the season rehabilitating back and left shoulder pain and only pitched in one game in the Western League.

On April 11, 2021, Taura pitched as a relief pitcher against the Tohoku Rakuten Golden Eagles, and recorded his first win. In 2021 season, he finished the regular season with a 19 Games pitched, a 1–0 Win–loss record, a 3.38 ERA, a one Hold, and a 17 strikeouts in 21.1 innings.

In 2022 season, hee only pitched in four games in the Pacific League.

References

External links

 Career statistics - NPB.jp
 56 Fumimaru Taura PLAYERS2022 - Fukuoka SoftBank Hawks Official site

1999 births
Living people
People from Ōnojō
Fukuoka SoftBank Hawks players
Japanese baseball players
Nippon Professional Baseball pitchers
Baseball people from Fukuoka Prefecture